This is a list of the works by Welsh poet and writer Dylan Thomas.

Poetry collections

1934 18 Poems, The Sunday Referee; Parton Bookshop 
1936 Twenty-Five Poems, Dent
1939 The Map of Love, Dent
1943 New Poems, New Directions
1946 Deaths and Entrances, Dent
1949 Twenty-Six Poems, Dent
1952 In Country Sleep and other poems, New Directions
1952 Collected Poems, 1934–1952, Dent
2014 The Collected Poems of Dylan Thomas: The New Centenary Edition, Weidenfeld and Nicolson

Collected prose
1940 Portrait of the Artist as a Young Dog, Dent
1941 The Death of the King's Canary (with John Davenport, posthumously published), Hutchinson
1946 Selected Writings of Dylan Thomas, New Directions
1953 Adventures in the Skin Trade and Other Stories (Adventures in the Skin Trade, an unfinished novel), New Directions
1954 Quite Early One Morning (planned by Thomas, posthumously published by New Directions)
1955 A Child's Christmas in Wales, New Directions
1955 A Prospect of the Sea and other stories and prose writings, Dent
1957 Letters to Vernon Watkins, Dent
1965 Rebecca's Daughters, Triton
1970 Twelve More Letters, Turret, (limited edition of 175)

Documentaries
All produced through Strand Films for the Ministry of Information. Thomas was script writer on all these documentaries and commentator on These are the Men and Our Country.
1942 The Conquest of a Germ
1942 These are the Men
1942 This is Colour
1942 New Towns for Old
1942 Balloon Site 586
1943 Green Mountain, Black Mountain
1943 Our Country
1943 Is Your Ernie Really Necessary
1943 Where are They Now?

Drama
1954 Under Milk Wood (Radio play)
1953 The Doctor and the Devils and Other Scripts

Screenplays
1948 No Room at the Inn (with Ivan Foxwell, adapted from the 1945 play by Joan Birt) 
1948 The Three Weird Sisters (with Louise Birt, adapted from the novel The Case of the Weird Sisters by Charlotte Armstrong)
1948 Rebecca's Daughters (produced posthumously) 
1953 The Doctor and the Devils
1964 The Beach at Falesa
1964 Twenty Years a-Growing (unfinished)

Collections
1963 Miscellany One: Poems, stories, broadcasts, Everyman Ltd, Reprint edition, 
1971 Miscellany Two: Including A Visit to Grandpa's and other stories and poems, Aldine, paperback / softback edition, 
1978 Miscellany Three: Poems, Stories”, C Nicholls & Company, 
1982 Selected Works, Guild Publishing, London
1984 The Collected Stories of Dylan Thomas, New Directions Publishing
1986 Collected Letters, ed. Paul Ferris, MacMillan
1992 On the Air With Dylan Thomas: The Broadcasts, ed. Ralph Maud, New Directions Publishing
1994 Eight Stories, W. W. Norton & Co
1995 Dylan Thomas: The Complete Screenplays, ed. John Ackerman, Applause Books
1997 Fern Hill: An Illustrated edition of the Dylan Thomas poem. Red Deer College Press, Canada
2000 Collected Poems 1934–1953, London: Phoenix
2000 Selected Poems, London: Phoenix

Illustrated
1971 The Outing illustrated by Meg Stevens, London: Dent (1985 edition illustrated by cartoonist Paul Cox, London: Dent)
1978 A Child's Christmas in Wales illustrated by Edward Ardizzone, London: Dent (1996: re-published as Dolphin Paperback from Orion Children's Books)

Audio recordingsDylan Thomas: Volume I — A Child's Christmas in Wales and Five Poems (Caedmon TC 1002–1952)Under Milk Wood (Caedmon TC 2005–1953)Dylan Thomas: Volume II — Selections from the Writings of Dylan Thomas (Caedmon TC 1018–1954)Dylan Thomas: Volume III — Selections from the Writings of Dylan Thomas (Caedmon TC 1043)Dylan Thomas: Volume IV — Selections from the Writings of Dylan Thomas (Caedmon TC 1061)Dylan Thomas: Quite early one morning and other memories (Caedmon TC 1132–1960)Dylan Thomas: Under Milk Wood and other plays'' (Naxos Audiobooks NA288712 – 2008) (originally BBC – 1954)

Notes

External links
 

Bibliographies by writer
Bibliographies of British writers
Poetry bibliographies
Works by Dylan Thomas